Zhiginovo is a rural locality (a village) in Yusvinskoye Rural Settlement, Yusvinsky District, Perm Krai, Russia. The population was 93 as of 2010. There are 3 streets.

Geography 
Zhiginovo is located 3 km northeast of Yusva (the district's administrative centre) by road. Anisimovo is the nearest rural locality.

References 

Rural localities in Yusvinsky District